Yvon may refer to:

 Yvon (given name), a masculine given name
 Yvon (surname), a surname

See also

 Chapelle-Yvon
 Evon
 Ivon
 Jaille-Yvon
 Pierre-Yvon
 Yvan
 Yvonne (disambiguation)